Memi or MEMI may refer to:

 Memi Bečirovič (born 1961), Slovenian professional basketball coach
 Ministry of Energy (Brunei), formerly known as the Ministry of Energy, Manpower and Industry (MEMI)
 Khayali (died 1556), nicknamed Bekār Memi ("Memi the Bachelor"), Ottoman poet

See also
 Memiş (disambiguation)
 Memmi (disambiguation)
 Memo (disambiguation)